Telephone numbers in Macau are eight-digit numbers. Fixed land line numbers start with 28, while mobile (cellular) phone numbers start with 6. Calls from Macau to mainland China, Hong Kong, Taiwan and Portugal are treated as international calls.

The telephone number for emergency services – Police, Fire Service and Ambulance – is 999 for all telephone lines. In addition to 999, two more emergency hotline numbers 110 (mainly for tourists from mainland China) and 112 (mainly for tourists from overseas) can be dialed, however calls made to 110 and 112 are redirected to the 999 call centre.

Government regulator

Prior to 1999 telephone regulation was under the Direcção dos Serviços de Correios e Telecomunicações (CTT) or Posts, Telegraphs and Telephones under the Secretary for Transport and Public Works.

Since 1999 telephone numbers are under the responsibility of the Direcção dos Serviços de Regulação de Telecomunicações (DSRT) or Bureau of Telecommunications Regulation under the Secretariat for Transport and Public Works.

Numbering scheme and format

 28xx xxxx - Residential/Business/Government (fixed line)
 6xxx xxxx - Cellular/Mobile phones
 8xxx xxxx - Business/Government (fixed line)

Telecom operators

 (Fixed line and mobile) – Companhia Telecomunicações de Macau, S.A.R.L. (CTM)
 (Mobile) – Hutchison Telephone (Macau) Co. Ltd
 (Mobile) – SmarTone Mobile Communications (Macau) Co. Ltd
 (Mobile) – China Telecom (Macau) Co. Ltd

See also
 Telecommunications in Macau
 Telephone numbers in Hong Kong
 Telephone numbering plan

References

 Direcção dos Serviços de Regulação de Telecomunicações (DSRT) 
 ITU allocation data

Macau
Communications in Macau
Macau-related lists